Singularity functions are a class of discontinuous functions that contain singularities, i.e. they are discontinuous at their singular points. Singularity functions have been heavily studied in the field of mathematics under the alternative names of generalized functions and distribution theory. The functions are notated with brackets, as  where n is an integer. The "" are often referred to as singularity brackets . The functions are defined as:

{| class="wikitable"
|-
! n
! 
|-
| 
| 
|-
| -2
|
|-
| -1
|
|-
| 0
| 
|-
| 1
| 
|-
| 2
| 
|-
| 
| 
|}

where:  is the Dirac delta function, also called the unit impulse. The value of  will depend upon the particular convention chosen for the Heaviside step function.
 is also called the Ramp function.

Integration 

Example beam calculation 
The deflection of a simply supported beam as shown in the diagram, with constant cross-section and elastic modulus, can be found using Euler–Bernoulli beam theory. Here we are using the sign convention of downwards forces and sagging bending moments being positive.

Load distribution:

Shear force:

Bending moment:

Slope:

Because the slope is not zero at x = 0, a constant of integration, c, is added

Deflection:

The boundary condition u = 0 at x = 4 m allows us to solve for c = −7 Nm2

See also
Macaulay brackets
Macaulay's method

References

External links
 Singularity Functions (Tim Lahey)
 Singularity functions (J. Lubliner, Department of Civil and Environmental Engineering)
 Beams: Deformation by Singularity Functions (Dr. Ibrahim A. Assakkaf)

Generalized functions